Guy Saint-Jacques was Canada's Ambassador to the People's Republic of China from 26 September 2012 until 9 October 2016.

Biography
St Jacques joined the Department of Foreign Affairs in 1977.

St Jacques served in New York City, Mexico City, Kinshasa, Hong Kong, Washington and London.

St Jacques was appointed Ambassador for Climate Change in 2010.

St Jacques was appointed to Beijing by John Baird, and presented his credentials to Hu Jintao. He liaised in Beijing extensively with Cong Peiwu, while the latter was Director-General of the Chinese Department of North American and Oceanian Affairs.

St Jacques retired after 30 years of service in October 2016, while Stephane Dion was Minister of Foreign Affairs and just short of one year after the Trudeau government came to power.

Controversies

Drop the gloves with China on canola
In March 2019, St Jacques suggested that in retaliation for China's suspension of canola imports from Canada that Canada could expel Chinese athletes who were training in Canada for the 2022 Beijing Winter Games and could bring Beijing before the UN Security Council where it could level accusations of bad faith. He also suggested bringing the Chinese to the WTO process.

To PMO: call me
St Jacques made the headlines in July 2019, when someone at the PMO convinced Paul Thoppil, ADM for Asia-Pacific at Global Affairs Canada, called him to ask for him not to comment on China in the media. St Jacques said the PMO should call him directly if it has a problem with what he is saying.

It came to light that the PMO had employed similar tactics with another Ambassador, David Mulroney. Later on once the damage had been done, the Minister in charge of Global Affairs, Chrystia Freeland, called him privately to beg his forgiveness, and her colleagues quashed a motion for an investigation by a Parliamentary subcommittee into the affair.

The two Ambassadors earned strong support in from Colin Robertson, a former colleague, when he said:

Chinese supply-chain v Hong Kong refugees
In early May 2020, St Jacques pointed out that it would be nice to shelter refugees from Hong Kong in light of the 2020 police crackdown on 2019 protestors for democracy:

References

Living people
Ambassadors of Canada to China
Year of birth missing (living people)